The Second Prayut cabinet, formally known as the 62nd Council of Ministers (คณะรัฐมนตรีไทย คณะที่ 62), was formed on 10 July 2019 after the March 2019 Thai general election. The coalition is led by Palang Pracharath Party which nominated Prayut Chan-o-cha, who was then serving as Prime Minister of Thailand through the National Council for Peace and Order, as its candidate for prime minister. Prayut was elected as prime minister on 5 June 2019 and received the appointment from the royal command on 9 June 2019.

The cabinet was officially sworn into office by King Rama X on 16 July 2019.

Lists of Ministers

See also 
 First Prayut cabinet

References 

 
2010s in Thailand
2020s in Thailand
Cabinets of Thailand
2019 establishments in Thailand
Cabinets established in 2019
 
Monarchism in Thailand
Prayut